Rana Sanaullah Khan (Punjabi,  born 1 January 1955) is a Pakistani politician serving as the 39th Interior Minister of Pakistan. He has been a member of the National Assembly of Pakistan since August 2018. He is a senior member of PML-N and the President of PML-N in Punjab province since 4 May 2019. Before getting elected to the National Assembly of Pakistan, Sanaullah had been elected to the Provincial Assembly of Punjab five times and had served in high-ranking ministries of the province.

Previously, he has served as the Law and Parliamentary Affairs Minister of Punjab from 2008 to 2018, Local Governments and Community Development Minister of Punjab from 2008 to 2014, Revenue Minister of Punjab from 2008 to 2013, Public Prosecution Minister of Punjab from 2008 to 2013, and the Deputy Leader of the Opposition (Punjab) from 1990 to 1993 and again from 2002 to 2007.

Early life and family
Sanaullah was born on 1 January 1955 in Faisalabad, Punjab, to Sher Muhammad Khan into a Muslim Rajput family, and is a practicing lawyer, holding a bachelor's degree in commerce from Government College, Faisalabad and an LLB from Punjab Law College, Lahore.

He's a cousin of former Chief Justice of Pakistan Iftikhar Muhammad Chaudhry.

Political career
He was elected to the Provincial Assembly of the Punjab as a candidate of Pakistan Peoples Party (PPP) in 1990 Pakistani general election.

He was re-elected to the Provincial Assembly of the Punjab as a candidate of Pakistan Muslim League (Nawaz) (PML-N) in 1997 Pakistani general election.

He was re-elected to the Provincial Assembly of the Punjab from PP-70 (Faisalabad-XX) as a candidate of (PML-N) in 2002 Pakistani general election. He was also elected as the leader of opposition of the Punjab Provincial Assembly. In 2003, he was abducted by alleged intelligence agency Inter-Services Intelligence (ISI) and was badly tortured for speaking against military regime. Different pictures published in different newspaper showed Rana without his signature moustache and a shaved head. His acquaintances claim that the torture resulted in such an everlasting effect that interrupted the natural process of hair growth and since then his hair didn't grow that bushy as they were before. When freed, he was subsequently shifted to DHQ hospital.

He was re-elected to the Provincial Assembly of the Punjab from PP-70 (Faisalabad-XX) as a candidate of (PML-N) in 2008 Pakistani general election.

He was re-elected to the Provincial Assembly of the Punjab from PP-70 (Faisalabad-XX) as a candidate of (PML-N) in 2013 Pakistani general election.

He was elected to the National Assembly of Pakistan from NA-106 (Faisalabad-VI) as a candidate of (PML-N) in 2018 Pakistani general election.

Political controversies

Warren Weinstein 
In August 2011, he accused an American contractor in Pakistan Warren Weinstein of being an American spy although Weinstein had lived in Pakistan for seven years and there was no evidence that he was a spy. Weinstein went missing a week later and was accidentally killed in a January 2015 US drone strike on the Afghanistan-Pakistan border, as announced by U.S. President Barack Obama at a White House press conference on April 23, 2015.

Model Town incident

On 17 June 2014, Punjab Police raided the Minhaj-ul-Quran International's lahore secretariat on the pretext of removing security barriers from its surroundings. Tahir-ul-Qadri's followers, who were preparing for his arrival from Canada to launch an anti-government movement on 23 June 2014, protested and deadly skirmishes started. A dozen of Tahir-ul-Qadri's devotees were killed including three women and around hundred got seriously wounded from bullet shots. Rana Sanaullah, who is considered only second to the Chief Minister, remained adamant that the police action was justified which added to the public fury.

In the wake of public reaction and opposition's criticism, Shahbaz Sharif sacked Rana Sanaullah Khan as law minister, and Punjab's top bureaucrat. However, Qadri and other opposition leaders including Imran Khan held Shahbaz Sharif, Chief Minister of Punjab, responsible for the civilian deaths at the hands of police and demanded his resignation. FIR of Model Town tragedy was registered against key figures of the present government including the Prime Minister, the Chief Minister and Rana Sanaullah Khan.

A joint-investigation-team (JIT) was later formed to investigate the incident. The government led JIT he was sworn in as Punjab Law Minister again in May 2015.

Narcotics case 
When Sanaullah was travelling from Faisalabad to Lahore in July 2019, the Anti Narcotics Force (ANF) Lahore team detained him close to the Ravi Toll Plaza on the highway. Under Section 9(C) of the Control of Narcotic Substances Act of 1997, which contains the death penalty, life in prison, or a sentence that may last up to 14 years in jail, as well as a fine of up to Rs1 million, a first information report was filed.

According to the First Information Report (FIR), Sanaullah was allegedly involved in drug trafficking and was transporting heroin to Lahore. This information had been provided to the force. He was twice denied bail by the trial court, but on December 24, 2019, the Lahore High Court granted him liberty.

Sanaullah’s plea 
Sanaullah claimed on 10 December 2022 that the case against him was "concocted, designed, and created" after the multiple hearings. In the name of justice, equity, and fair play, he pleaded with the court to drop the charges against him. Sanaullah's lawyer informed the court that "Sanaullah had nothing to do with narcotics" and that "the case was a political ploy." He added that there were contradictions between the witness testimony and the camera footage.

Imtiaz Ahmed, Assistant Director of the ANF, and Inspector Ehsaan Azam rejected the accusations against him during the final hearing, calling them "false." Along with other petitioners, Sanaullah asserted that this was an instance of political victimization. They said that Pakistan Tehreek-e-Insaf (PTI) leader Fawad Chaudhry had explicitly stated that this case had not been filed during the administration of ousted primer minister Imran Khan and had instead been brought by "influential people" in the country.

Acquittal in narcotics case 
Interior Minister Rana Sanaullah was exonerated on December 10th, 2022 by a special court in Lahore following multiple hearings and his submission of a plea.

References 

Living people
1950 births
Pakistani lawyers
Pakistani prisoners and detainees
Punjab MPAs 1990–1993
Punjab MPAs 1997–1999
Punjab MPAs 2002–2007
Punjab MPAs 2008–2013
Punjab MPAs 2013–2018
Pakistani MNAs 2018–2023
Pakistan People's Party MPAs (Punjab)
Pakistan Muslim League (N) MPAs (Punjab)
Pakistan Muslim League (N) MNAs
People from Faisalabad
Punjabi people
Politicians from Faisalabad
Government College University Faisalabad alumni
Punjab University Law College alumni